Founded in 2010, BookShout is a software based eBook distributor, with offices in Dallas, TX, Fort Wayne, IN and New York, NY. It is the largest provider of bulk eBook distribution in the world and works with all of the major U.S. publishing houses including HarperCollins, Macmillan, McGraw Hill, Penguin Random House, Perseus, Simon & Schuster, Wiley, Chronicle Books, Hachette Publishing Group, and Workman. The company has evolved from its initial business model of facilitating bulk eBook distribution to additionally providing publishers with customizable direct-to-consumer digital storefronts.

The company has also carved out a business services component of their business model, partnering with major corporations including, the Hearst Corporation, Intel, Microsoft, Sony, Cheerios, T-Mobile, CareerBuilder, Cisco, The Wall Street Journal, Salesforce, Google, Deloitte and others to aide in the marketing and promotion of products, as well as in the onboarding, education and training of employees through the use of eBooks.

The company is the creator of a proprietary reading app that gives users the ability to interact with friends directly in the app for a unique social reading experience. BookShout has native eReader applications on Android and iOS and can be accessed directly on the web. There are currently more than 2 million users on the BookShout reading platform.

References

American companies established in 2010
Companies based in Dallas
Ebook suppliers